Sage Hen Dam is an earthfill type dam on Sage Hen Creek, in Gem County, Idaho, United States. Its reservoir is called Sage Hen Reservoir and is located in the West Mountains of Boise National Forest between Boise and McCall. The dam is owned by the Squaw Creek Irrigation Company and does not produce electricity. The reservoir is stocked with rainbow and has a native population of  redband trout. It also has recreation facilities that include four campgrounds, a boat ramp, and fishing docks.

References

Dams in Idaho
Buildings and structures in Elmore County, Idaho
Dams completed in 1938
Earth-filled dams
1938 establishments in Idaho
United States privately owned dams